The snowcocks or snowfowl are a group of bird species in the genus Tetraogallus of the pheasant family, Phasianidae. They are ground-nesting birds that breed in the mountain ranges of southern Eurasia from the Caucasus to the Himalayas and western China. Some of the species have been introduced into the United States.  Snowcocks feed mainly on plant material.

Characteristics
Snowcocks are bulky, long-necked, long-bodied partridge-like birds. Males and females are generally similar in appearance but females tend to be slightly smaller and rather duller in colouration than males. They are generally grey with varying amounts of white, black and brown according to species and with distinctive white under tail-coverts. The colour of juvenile snowcocks is similar to the colour of the females and the young are not fully grown until their second year of life.

Snowcocks are heavy birds and are unable to fly far with flapping flight. Instead they run to a high point, launch themselves into the air and glide, gradually losing altitude. They are to be found on open slopes above the tree line where they feed on leaves, shoots, roots, fruits, berries and insects.

Distribution
The snowcocks are each endemic to different mountain ranges in Asia where they are normally found on open slopes above the tree line. Only in the case of the Himalayan snowcock and the Tibetan snowcock do their ranges overlap.

The Caucasian snowcock occurs in the Caucasus Mountains in Azerbaijan, Georgia and the Russian Federation. It has been introduced into the United States. The Caspian snowcock is native to eastern Turkey, Armenia, Azerbaijan, Iran, Iraq and Georgia and has been introduced into the United States. The Tibetan snowcock is native to mountain ranges in India, Nepal, Bhutan, Tajikistan and China. The Himalayan snowcock occurs in mountainous areas of Afghanistan, Tajikistan, Turkmenistan, Uzbekistan, Kazakhstan, Kyrgyzstan, Pakistan, Nepal, India and China and has been introduced into the United States. The Altai snowcock is endemic to high altitudes in Kazakhstan, Mongolia, China and the Russian Federation.

Species
The five species within the genus along with subspecies are:

References

Taxa named by John Edward Gray